Leon Patitsas (Greek: Λέων Πατίτσας; born 1976) is a London-born Greek shipowner, founder and owner of Atlas Maritime.

Early life
Leon Patitsas was born on February 10, 1976, in London, the son of Spyridon "Spyros" Patitsas and Marigo Lemou-Patitsa, who is the daughter of Captain Leon C. Lemos. Patitsas has an older brother, Philimon Patitsas.

Patitsas educated at Moraitis School, a private school in Athens, followed by a degree in Mechanical Engineering from Tufts University, Boston. and a Master of Science from MIT.

Career
Patitsas founded Atlas Maritime in 2004.

Personal life
In 2006, Patitsas began dating Marietta Chrousala, a Greek fashion model and TV presenter. They married on June 5, 2010, and have three children together. The 2008 "Posidonia" party took place aboard the Greek cruiser Georgios Averof, a famous war memorial.

In 2013, Patitsas bought a loft apartment in New York City for $5.5 million.

References

1976 births
Living people
Lemos family
Tufts University School of Engineering alumni
Greek businesspeople